NGC 5823 (also known as Caldwell 88) is an open cluster in the southern constellation of Circinus, near (and extending across) its border with the constellation Lupus. It was discovered by Scottish astronomer James Dunlop in 1826.

External links
 
 

Open clusters
Circinus (constellation)
Astronomical objects discovered in 1826
5823
Discoveries by James Dunlop